Vasireddy may refer to:

 Vasireddy Venkatadri Nayudu - the last king of the Vasireddy clan
 Vasireddy Seethadevi - a Telugu writer of Andhra Pradesh, India 
 Vasireddy Sri Krishna - Vice Chancellor of Andhra University 
 Raja of Muktyala - also known as Vasireddy Ramagopalakrishna Maheswara Prasad, member of the Vasireddy clan
 Vasireddy Venkatadri Institute of Technology - an engineering college in Guntur district, Andhra Pradesh, India